William Mallory (died 1646) of Studley Royal, Yorkshire was an English politician who sat in the House of Commons  variously between 1614 and 1642. He supported the Royalist side in the English Civil War. His father, John Mallory (died 1619), was also an MP of Ripon.

Mallory was elected Member of Parliament for Ripon  in 1614 and re-elected in 1621 1624  and 1625. He was then re-elected MP for Ripon in 1628 and sat until 1629 when King Charles decided to rule without parliament for eleven years.

In April 1640, Mallory was re-elected MP for Ripon in the Short Parliament and again in November 1640 for the Long Parliament. He was disabled from sitting in parliament on 16 September 1642 for supporting the King.

Mallory died in 1646.

Mallory married  Dorothy Bellingham, daughter of Sir James Bellingham of Levens, Westmorland. Their son John Mallory (1610–1655) was also MP for Ripon.

References

 
 

Year of birth missing
1646 deaths
Cavaliers
English MPs 1614
English MPs 1621–1622
English MPs 1624–1625
English MPs 1628–1629
English MPs 1640 (April)
English MPs 1640–1648
People from the Borough of Harrogate